Josef or Joseph Derossi or de Rossi (6 August 1768 – 18 December 1841) was an Austrian actor. He is notable as the first manager of the Düsseldorfer Schauspielhaus in Düsseldorf from 1818 onwards.

Life
He began his career in 1786 playing lover roles and stock character roles.

External links

18th-century Austrian male actors
19th-century Austrian male actors
Austrian male actors
1768 births
1841 deaths
19th-century theatre managers